Noroton is a census-designated place (CDP) in the town of Darien, Fairfield County, Connecticut, United States. It occupies the southwest part of Darien, from the Metro-North Railroad in the north to Long Island Sound in the south. The southern half of the community occupies Noroton Neck, between Holly Pond to the west and the Goodwives River to the east. It is bordered to the west by the city of Stamford and to the east by the Tokeneke neighborhood of Darien. To the north is Noroton Heights.

It was first listed as a CDP prior to the 2020 census.

References 

Census-designated places in Fairfield County, Connecticut
Census-designated places in Connecticut